Kirill Mikhanovsky is a Russian-American director, screenwriter, editor, and producer, best known for directing the critically acclaimed 2019 American comedy drama Give Me Liberty.

Biography
Mikhanovsky grew up in Moscow. While attending the University of Wisconsin–Milwaukee, where he majored in linguistics, Mikhanovsky drove medical transport for disabled people. Around that time, Mikhanovsky wrote and directed a short film, Terra, Terra. While in the NYU Grad Film Program Mikhanovsky studied directing under Boris Frumin.

Career
Mikhanovsky made his directorial debut with Sonhos de Peixe, shot with non-actors in a fishing village in the Northeast of Brazil. Sonhos de Peixe premiered in the Semaine de la Critique section of the 59th Cannes Film Festival, where it was awarded Prix Regards Jeunes.

Mikhanovsky directed Give Me Liberty, which had its world premiere in the Directors' Fortnight section of the 72nd annual Cannes Film Festival. “Working from a screenplay he wrote with Alice Austen (who’s also a producer), Mikhanovsky proves to be a virtuoso of chaos,” wrote Manohla Dargis of The New York Times. Give Me Liberty made the Top Independent Films list of the 91st National Board of Review Awards. It received four Independent Spirit Award nominations, including Best Editing for Mikhanovsky and Best Feature Under $500,000 (John Cassavetes Award), winning in the last category.

Mikhanovsky co-wrote Fellipe Gamarano Barbosa’s Gabriel and the Mountain.

Mikhanovsky spent five years researching and developing a modern-day tragicomedy set in Havana, Cuba. The film wasn’t produced.

Mikhanovsky is a co-founder of Give Me Liberty, Mfg., a film and TV production company.

Filmography

Awards and nominations

References

External links

 Kirill Mikhanovsky at the Independent Spirit Awards

Living people
American film directors
American male screenwriters
Year of birth missing (living people)